Burhan Sönmez is a Kurdish prize-winning novelist from Turkey. He is the President of PEN International, elected at the Centennial Congress in 2021.

He is a Senior Member of Hughes Hall College and Trinity College, University of Cambridge.

Sönmez is the author of five novels. His first novel, North (Kuzey), was published in 2009 in Turkey. His second novel, Sins and Innocents (Masumlar), was published in 2011.
His third novel, Istanbul Istanbul, was published in 2015. Labyrinth, his fourth novel, got published in 2018. His last novel is Stone and Shadow, published in 2021.

He received "Disturbing the Peace" award given by Vaclav Havel Library Foundation in New York (2017).

He was awarded the EBRD Literature Prize in London (2018) for his novel Istanbul Istanbul. Sins and Innocents has received the Sedat Simavi Literature Prize, and Stone and Shadow received the Orhan Kemal Novel Award. His novels are being published in more than forty countries such as by Gallimard (France), Other Press (USA), Random House (Germany), Nottetempo (Italy).

Biography
Burhan Sönmez is a dual Turkish/British national. He was born in Turkey. He grew up speaking Turkish and Kurdish, then later moved to Istanbul where he worked for a time as a lawyer. He was member of Human Rights Society (IHD) and a founder of TAKSAV (Foundation for Social Research, Culture and Art). He was among founders of daily BirGün, an opposition newspaper. He was seriously injured following an assault by police in 1996 in Turkey and received treatment in Britain for a long period of time (with the support of the Freedom from Torture.)

Even though he was interested in poetry and won awards in two national poetry competitions in Turkey, he turned his hand to writing novels. His interest in writing, storytelling and modern literature is rooted in the traditional stories and legends he was brought up with. His unique experience of growing up in a remote village with no electricity, and having a talented storyteller for a mother, has provided perspective, inspiration and material for his writing.

He has written for various newspapers and magazines like The Guardian, Der Spiegel, Die Zeit, La Repubblica. He translated the poetry book of The Marriage of Heaven and Hell by William Blake into Turkish. He was a member of judging panel for 2014 Cevdet Kudret Literature Prize, 2020 Geneva International Film Festival and 2023 Inge Feltrinelli Prize. He lectured in Literature and Novel at the METU.

He lives between Cambridge and Istanbul.

Literary Career

North (Kuzey)

Burhan Sönmez's first novel, North, is the story of a young man whose father leaves when the protagonist is two years old, and returns twenty years later as a corpse. In trying to solve the mystery of his father's death, our hero embarks on a journey to the North in search of his father's identity, which at times becomes his own. Eastern folk tales and legends have been woven into the story, which questions and reflects the nature of identity, reality and existence.

North could be described as a philosophical fairy tale. It tells the myths and legends of the East in a realistic fashion, and is based around philosophical debates on existence and love that have a central importance in solving the mystery.

Sins and Innocents (Masumlar)
His second novel, Sins and Innocents, published in 2011 and received the Sedat Simavi Literature Prize that is a prominent literature award in Turkey. It tells a story of two people whose paths come across on a foreign land. A woman carries a "book" and believes in poetry. A man, suffering from insomnia, struggles to survive through graves. Each of them has got a secret and a sin. On the day they meet the woman reads his fortune in the "book" and he sings the songs of desert. Sins and Innocents tells the story of two people whose lives have been running through Haymana Plain, Tehran and Cambridge ...

Istanbul Istanbul
His third novel, Istanbul Istanbul, was published in 2015. It is the story of four prisoners in the underground cells in Istanbul. When they are not being subjected to torture, the four tell one another stories about Istanbul to pass the time. The underground narrative gradually turns into the narrative of the above ground. Initially centered around persons, the novel comes to focus on the city of Istanbul. There is as much suffering or hope in the Istanbul above ground as there is in the cells underground.

Like the tales in The Decameron, the novel has ten chapters. Each chapter is narrated by one of the occupants of the cell. “Istanbul was a city of a million cells and every cell was an Istanbul unto itself.” In every piece, person and event, the novel evokes Istanbul as a city in its entirety. It is a novel that appears political but is in reality about love. It appears to focus on the stories of individuals but is in reality about the city of Istanbul. Rather than being about capital production, the focus is on the city's spatial and spiritual reproduction. In modes of thought suggested by Althusser and Manuel Castells, the city of Istanbul is the site of reproduction for pain, misery, melancholy and hope.  There are two Istanbuls, one below ground and one above. Yet in reality both are one and the same.

Labyrinth
Labyrinth was published in 2018. It is the story of Boratin, a blues singer, who attempts suicide by jumping off the Bosphorus Bridge in Istanbul, but opens his eyes in hospital. He loses his memory and can't remember why he wished to end his life. He remembers only things that are unrelated to himself, but confuses their time. When he sees the figurine of Jesus and the Virgin Mary he recognises them but he cannot work out whether they lived thousands of years ago or just few years ago. He knows the Ottoman Empire fell, and that the last sultan died, but has no idea when. From the confusion of his social and individual memory, he is faced with two questions. The first is related to the body. Does physical recognition provide a sense of identity? The second question concerns the mind. Which is more liberating for a man, or a society: knowing the past, or forgetting it? Labyrinth, embroidered with Borgesian micro-stories, flows smoothly on the surface while traversing sharp bends beneath the current.

Stone and Shadow
Stone and Shadow, published in 2021, and received Orhan Kemal Novel Award in 2022, is the story of Avdo, a tombstone craftsman, whose life tells the social history of modern Turkey. His life journey gets involved with many other lives that reflects different cultural backgrounds including Christians, Sunni Muslims, Alawites, Turks, Kurds, Armenians. Avdo's story starts in the city of Mardin as an orphan. He is being protected by an Assyrian man who teaches him the art of sculpting tombstones. He travels from city to city and comes across Elif, the only love of his life, in a small Anatolian village. Avdo's dreams get shattered there when he has to kill two village men.

The story opens in the 1980s, during the times of military coup, in Istanbul. The story-line constantly shifts between the past and future. Alongside the contemporary period, the story of different times like Ottoman era, and of different places in the Middle East and Europe eventually creates an encompassing historical map of many different societies. By moving from one scene to another, the story collects all fragments one by one to form a whole picture in the end.

Reviews 
“The book, Labyrinth, reads like a fever dream. Boratin is a listless existential hero who often drifts through his days with an alienation befitting a Camus protagonist.” The New York Times

"One of the most exciting, innovative voices." Harvard Review

“Stone and Shadow has already taken place in the history of the novel as an important work. Burhan Sönmez creates his own original canon with his epic-modern narrative works. He is moving towards being the same for Turkey as Gabriel Garcia Marquez is for Colombia, Naguip Mahfouz for Egypt, Carlos Fuentes is for Mexico, Mo Yan is for China.” T24 news

“The real achievement of Stone and Shadow is that its depth opens to multi-layered reading, and invites readers to reflect on universal themes such as lies and truth, love and sacrifice, rootlessness and suffering caused by war, violence and migration.” Hürriyet newspaper, Book&Art supplement

“Stone and Shadow is an unofficial history of Turkey. Although the novel follows an emotional route and proceeds on a romantic outline, Burhan Sönmez lays out the historical realities on the map of the time in the novel.” Gazete Duvar, Book supplement

“The main purpose of the novel is to remind once again all these forgotten and suppressed traumas with the power of literature. The meticulous plot of the novel creates a modern sense of 1001 Nights, or Decameron.” BirGün newspaper

“The Stone and Shadow is still fresh, but with its plot, style and carefully enliven language, I think it will be talked about very much and will be up-to-date over many years.” Yeni Yaşam newspaper

“This profound book navigates the psychogeography of Istanbul to interrogate that most mysterious creature: the self. Burhan Sönmez’s masterful novel, Labyrinth, which traverses these themes with a lucidly Borgesian, yet stirringly original hand.” Asymptote Journal

“Compact, thought-provoking, and gently exquisite, Labyrinth, the fourth novel by Burhan Sönmez, quietly establishes him as one of Europe’s great contemporary authors.” World Literature Today

“Accessible and profound, Labyrinth, bringing to mind Albert Camus and Patrick Modiano.” Publishers Weekly

“A thoughtful novel. Labyrinth is a mind-twister.” NPR Books

“This short, elliptical novel by the author of Istanbul Istanbul follows him into its pathways, conjuring the ineluctable entanglement of place and person.” Literary Hub

“Labyrinth, like many fictional works written in reaction to political oppression, is an allegory that explores the fractured nature of the individual in a society suspended between a rich, complicated past and an uncertain future.” Washington Independent Review of Books

“Istanbul Istanbul looks like a political novel but has nothing to do with the actual politics. We can feel the Decameron by Boccaccio in the novel's texture, but we can follow footsteps of the Invisible Cities by Italo Calvino in its substance. ‘Cities,’ says Calvino, ‘are the places of exchange, as it is told in the history books, it is not only commercial exchange rather exchanging words, desires and memories.’ The characters in Istanbul Istanbul exchange words, desires and memories.”
Ömer Türkeş, SabitFikir News (Turkey)

"Sonmez’s words are conquering the whole world." 
ADNKronos (Italy)

“The characters in Istanbul Istanbul are like the flaneurs who turned the streets of Paris into reality by pacing it up and down. As the streets are transformed into passages, as described by Walter Benjamin with the inspiration of Baudelaire, the prisons and the cells are transformed into streets of Istanbul by Burhan Sönmez.”
Emrah Tuncer, DemokratHaber News (Turkey)

“Istanbul Istanbul is creating a space of its own both in urban culture and in philosophical depth with its multilayered structure and multiple meaning like classical works. It will have its unique place in the history of literature as a work of intertextuality, and a novel of new-ages. I can heartily say that he is the ‘expected author’ who will be rising the flag.”
Hayri K. Yetik, Mesele Literary Magazine (Turkey)

“Burhan Sönmez brings the Eastern narrative and the Western form together by adding parables, riddles, and, of course, mysterious stories of Istanbul into his novel.”
Banu Yıldıran Genç, Agos KitapKirk Literary Magazine (Turkey)

“Yes, our country is turning into hell and it is getting more and more difficult to find any light here. That’s why you should leave this novel in the public places, forget it in the cafes, read it out loud on the ferries. Let everyone hear Burhan Sönmez’s voice, and get everyone to resist pain and sorrow.”
Ümran Küçükislamoğlu, T24 News (Turkey)

"Around Sönmez can be seen a constellation of literary world that includes Garcia Marquez (Tatar Photographer in Sins&Innocents reminds me of Melquiades in One Hundred Years of Solitude), the Turkish author Tanpinar, Tolstoy (two authors also dear to Orhan Pamuk), Wittgenstein, the Iranian poet Forough Farrokhzad." 
Fabio de Propris, il manifesto (Italy)

"Sins&Innocents is an impressive novel that carries both the melancholy of the lost and the hope for the future. The Romantics had a pattern of running to the nature due to the nausea of modernism. Brani Tawo, the protagonist, has a voice of romanticism but we should call it a revolutionary romanticism because of his willpower to change the life." 
Omer Turkes, Radikal (Turkey)

"Haymana of Sins&Innocents is a sort of Anatolian Macondo." 
Tommaso Giartosio, Radio 3 Fahrenheit (Italy)

"Burhan Sonmez is a silent revolutionary in our literature. Sins&Innocents has a limpid and pure language, a core-language. Sorrow and sadness get a poetic character through Sins&Innocents. It is a literary black-hole in a positive way. It swallows readers, and gets them through a black-hole, and transforms them into an emotion-man and a truth-seeking-man."
Pakize Barista, Taraf (Turkey)

"Burhan Sönmez has the air of timid philosophers with a determination that breaks the stones."
Igiaba Scego, Corriere Delle Migrazioni (Italy)

"Burhan Sonmez opens the door of wounded memory of Kurds. He doesn't have a proclivity for questions of ‘Who am I?’ or ‘What am I?’ He asks: Where am I?" 
Dervis Aydin Akkoc, Ozgur Gundem (Turkey)

"You may think that the place in the novel is not Haymana of Anatolian Plains but Macondo of One Hundred Years of Solitude. The parts in Sins&Innocents that take place in Cambridge whisper us a style that is plainer than Ernest Hemingway's." 
Erdinc Akkoyunlu, Star (Turkey)

"If Yasar Kemal wrote this novel he would keep the same way of wording but it would last hundreds of pages. Burhan Sönmez can be regarded as Yasar Kemal's tight-lipped son." 
Metin Celal, Cumhuriyet (Turkey)

"The more a book forces us to dig deeper within ourselves the more it is important. Sins&Innocents has this power." 
Senzaudio (Italy)

"Burhan Sönmez salutes G.G. Marquez with his breath of magical realism that comes into leaf in Anatolian soil." 
Dogus Sarpkaya, BirGun (Turkey)

References 
 PEN International pen-international.org
 Official Website burhansonmez.com
 The New York Times book review
 Harvard Review
 The Guardian -The last station
 BBC World Book Club
 European Literature
 Asymptote Journal -Labyrinth
 www.dw.com -Our society
 Interview with Burhan Sonmez in Rome
 Pen Ten interview
 Eurolit Network
 Book review
 t24.com.tr -Stone and Shadow a classic
 Hurriyet daily -Stone and Shadow

1965 births
Living people
Turkish writers
Istanbul University Faculty of Law alumni
PEN International